Sandspit Airport  is located  northeast of Sandspit, British Columbia, Canada.

Douglas DC-4 crash 
On January 19, 1952, a Douglas DC-4 on Northwest Orient Airlines Flight 324 attempted to land at Sandspit Airport due to a failed engine. Although the plane touched down on the runway, it lifted off again before coming to a halt.

Airlines and destinations

See also 
Alliford Bay Water Aerodrome
List of accidents and incidents involving the Douglas DC-4

References

External links

Certified airports in British Columbia
Airports in Haida Gwaii
North Coast Regional District